Grafton High School (abbreviated as GHS) is government-funded co-educational dual modality partially academically selective and comprehensive secondary day school, located in , in the Mid North Coast region of New South Wales, Australia.

Established in 1912, the school enrolled approximately 900 students in 2018, from Year 7 to Year 12, of whom 15 percent identified as Indigenous Australians and four percent were from a language background other than English. The school is operated by the NSW Department of Education; the principal is Scott Dinham.

History 

Grafton High School was established on 1 January 1912 and opened on 1 July of that year as a formal education system was being established in New South Wales. A new building opened on 17 May 1915.

See also
 List of government schools in New South Wales
 List of selective high schools in New South Wales
 List of schools in the Northern Rivers and Mid North Coast
 Education in Australia

References

External links
 

Public high schools in New South Wales
Selective schools in New South Wales
1912 establishments in Australia
Educational institutions established in 1912
High School